Frederica of Mecklenburg-Strelitz (3 March 1778 – 29 June 1841) was Queen of Hanover as the wife of King Ernest Augustus from 20 June 1837 until her death in 1841. She was a German princess who married successively Prince Louis Charles of Prussia, Prince Frederick William of Solms-Braunfels, and her first-cousin Prince Ernest Augustus, Duke of Cumberland (later King of Hanover). She became a British princess and Duchess of Cumberland when she married Ernest Augustus, the fifth son and eighth child of King George III and Queen Charlotte, her paternal aunt.

Frederica was born in the Altes Palais of Hanover. She was the fifth daughter of Charles II, Duke of Mecklenburg-Strelitz, and his first wife, Princess Friederike of Hesse-Darmstadt. Her father assumed the title of Grand Duke of Mecklenburg on 18 June 1815.

Early life
Frederica's mother died on 22 May 1782 after giving birth to her tenth child. Two years later (28 September 1784), her father remarried the younger sister of his deceased wife, Princess Charlotte of Hesse-Darmstadt, but this union ended just one year later, when Charlotte died of complications resulting from childbirth on 12 December 1785.

The twice-widowed Duke Charles considered himself unable to give his daughters proper rearing and education, so he sent Frederica and her elder sisters Charlotte, Therese and Louise to their maternal grandmother, Princess Maria Louise of Hesse-Darmstadt. Princess Maria Louise's choice of a Swiss teacher for the girls, Salomé de Gélieu, proved to be a good one. Some time later, Duke Charles also sent his two surviving sons, the Hereditary Grand Duke George and Charles, to be raised by their grandmother.

First marriage
Frederica's father was anxious to arrange advantageous marriages for all his daughters, and used family connections to bring this about. Queen Frederika Louisa of Hesse-Darmstadt, wife of King Frederick William II, was a first cousin of Frederica's mother. Frederica's father broached with the Prussian royal family the idea of marriage between their children, and the Prussians were not averse. On 14 March 1793, the Princesses of Mecklenburg-Strelitz "coincidentally" met the Prussian King Frederick William II at the Prussian Theatre in Frankfurt-am-Main. He was immediately captivated by the grace and charm of both sisters, Frederica and Louise. The pending marriage negotiations received traction, and within weeks, the matter was settled: Frederica's elder sister Louise would marry Crown Prince Frederick William, and Frederica would marry his younger brother Prince Louis.

The double engagement was celebrated in Darmstadt on 24 April 1793, only a few weeks after the sisters fortuitously met their future father-in-law at the theatre. On December 24, Louise and Crown Prince Frederick William were married in the Royal Palace of Berlin; two days later, on 26 December, Frederica and Prince Louis were also married at the same venue.

Unlike her sister, Frederica did not enjoy a happy marriage. Although her husband died only three years after the wedding, Louis was said to have preferred the company of his mistresses and completely neglected his wife, or at least, that is her version; in response, she allegedly began an affair with her husband's uncle Prince Louis Ferdinand. Despite her husband's alleged neglect, Frederica did bear him three children in as many years: Frederick in 1794; a short-lived son, Charles, in 1795; and a daughter, Frederica, in 1796.

In 1795, King Frederick William II appointed Louis as Chief of the Dragoons Regiment No.1, which was stationed in Schwedt. One year later, on 23 December 1796, Prince Louis died of diphtheria. It was three years almost to the day since their wedding. At this time, his youngest child, Frederica, was less than three months old, and his eldest son was hardly two years old. After Louis's death, his father provided Frederica with a suitable residence near Berlin, and a sufficient income, and she moved with her three children to Schönhausen Palace near Berlin.

In 1797, Frederica and her cousin Prince Adolphus, Duke of Cambridge, seventh son of King George III of Great Britain by his wife Queen Charlotte (Frederica's paternal aunt), became unofficially engaged. The Duke of Cambridge asked the consent of his father to the marriage. The King did not refuse his consent but asked his son to wait until the ongoing war with France was over. The relationship eventually ended, with rumors circulating that either Adolphus had offered to release Frederica from the engagement, or – as Queen Charlotte believed – Frederica had jilted him for another man.

Second marriage
In 1798 Frederica became pregnant. The father was Prince Frederick William of Solms-Braunfels. The prince recognized his paternity and requested her hand in marriage, a proposal that was quickly granted in order to avoid scandal. On 10 December of that year, the couple was married in Berlin and immediately moved to Ansbach. Two months later, in February 1799, Frederica gave birth to a daughter who only lived eight months. Prince Frederick William, disappointed and embittered, resumed his old dissipated lifestyle and became an alcoholic. In 1805 he resigned his military posts for "health reasons". Frederica had to maintain her family with her own resources after her brother-in-law, King Frederick William III of Prussia, refused to restore her annual pension as a dowager princess of Prussia. Frederica's older brother-in-law and head of the family, William Christian, Prince of Solms-Braunfels, advised her to get a divorce, with his full approval. She and her husband nonetheless refused.

Third marriage
In May 1813, during a visit to his uncle Duke Charles in Neustrelitz, Prince Ernest Augustus, Duke of Cumberland and Teviotdale, the fifth son of King George III of Great Britain, met and fell in love with Frederica, who was his first cousin. Duke Charles made it clear to his daughter that her separation from the Prince of Solms-Braunfels was absolutely logical, and that he saw a marriage with an English prince as a great opportunity for her. During the next months Frederica considered the intentions of Ernest Augustus and the possible effects on her own situation. When, after the victory of the allies in the Battle of Leipzig, Ernest Augustus spent some days in Neustrelitz, he was greeted enthusiastically. Some time later Frederica asked the Prussian king for approval for her divorce from Prince Frederick William of Solms-Braunfels. All parties agreed, including the Prince of Solms-Braunfels, but Frederick William's sudden death on 13 April 1814 precluded the need for a divorce. The prince's demise was considered by some as a little too convenient, and some suspected that Frederica had poisoned him. In August, the engagement with Ernest Augustus was officially announced. After the British Prince Regent gave his consent to the wedding, Frederica and Ernest Augustus were married on 29 May 1815 at the parish church of Neustrelitz. Some time later, the couple traveled to Great Britain and married again on 29 August 1815 at Carlton House, London.

Queen Charlotte bitterly opposed the marriage, even though her future daughter-in-law was also her niece. She refused to attend the wedding and advised her son to live outside England with his wife. Frederica never obtained the favor of her aunt/mother-in-law, who died unreconciled with her in 1818. During her marriage to Ernest Augustus she gave birth three times, but only a son survived, who would eventually become King George V of Hanover.

Queen of Hanover
On 20 June 1837 King William IV of the United Kingdom and Hanover died without surviving legitimate issue. His heir was Princess Victoria, only legitimate child of Prince Edward, Duke of Kent and Strathearn, but because Hanover had been ruled under semi-Salic Law since the times of the Holy Roman Empire, she could not inherit the Hanoverian throne. The next male descendant of the late king was the Duke of Cumberland, Frederica's husband, who then became King of Hanover, with Frederica as his queen consort.

After a short illness, Queen Frederica of Hanover died in 1841 at Hanover. The Court master builder Georg Ludwig Friedrich Laves was instructed by the King to build a mausoleum for his wife and himself in the garden of the chapel at Herrenhausen Palace. He also gave royal orders for the transformation of a central square near the Leineschloss and renamed it Friederikenplatz in her honour.

Children

Ancestry

References

External links

1778 births
1841 deaths
Hanoverian royal consorts
Hanoverian princesses by marriage
House of Hanover
House of Mecklenburg-Strelitz
Nobility from Hanover
Cumberland
Wives of British princes
House of Hohenzollern
Prussian princesses
House of Solms-Braunfels
Burials at Berggarten Mausoleum, Herrenhausen (Hanover)
Daughters of monarchs